Lebanese people in France include migrants from Lebanon to France, as well as their descendants.

Population
The Lebanese population in France is estimated to be from 300,000

History
Although there has been sporadic migration from the Middle East to France since the 17th century, the real growth of the French Lebanese population began in 1975, with the start of the civil war in Lebanon which drove thousands of people away. No concrete data exists on the religious affiliations; however, it is commonly assumed that Maronite Christians and Shia Muslims make up the majority of the Lebanese population in France.

Notable people

See List of Lebanese people in France

See also
 Arabs in France
 Arabs in Europe
 Arab diaspora
 French Lebanese
 France–Lebanon relations
 French language in Lebanon

References

Arabs in France
 
 
France
Immigration to France by country of origin